Claire Healy (born 1971) and Sean Cordeiro (born 1974) are a partnership of contemporary Australian artists best known for their large-scale installations. They have exhibited in Japan, the United States, Singapore, Malaysia, Germany and across Australia. They won the 2022 Sir John Sulman Prize for Raiko and Shuten-dōji.

Career 
Healy was born in Melbourne. She met Sean Cordeiro at the University of New South Wales while completing a Bachelor of Fine Arts in 1997. They began exhibiting collaboratively in 2001 and both went on to complete a Master of Fine Arts in 2004. They were founding members of the artist-run space Imperial Slacks in Sydney which ran from 1999 to 2003. They currently live in the Blue Mountains.

Healy and Cordeiro are best known for their large-scale installations and site-specific works that often encompass found materials. Their work is held in the collections of the Museum of Contemporary Art and Newcastle Art Gallery.

Awards 
 1996 The Union Steel Award
 1997 Dr Gene Sherman Award, Sherman Galleries
 2000 Australian Post Graduate Award
 2022 Sir John Sulman Prize winners for Raiko and Shuten-dōji

References

External links 
 Artist website

Art duos
Australian installation artists
University of New South Wales alumni
Living people